The Girl in the White Coat is a 2011 Canadian drama film directed and written by Darrell Wasyk, based on the short story The Overcoat by Nikolai Gogol.

Plot
Elise, a factory worker who lives in isolation and is tormented by her co-workers, decides that despite her lack of money, she must get her coat fixed. A case of mistaken identity pulls her into events she had not intended.

Cast
 Steven Bettez as Security Guard
 Christian Grenier	as Andy
 Joey Klein as Sterling
 Roc LaFortune as Mr. Rossi
 Louise Marleau as Mrs. Prouve
 Monique Mercure as Mrs. Valinsky
 Pascale Montpetit as Elise
 Neil Napier as Spike
 Julien Poulin as Elise's Father
 Paul Savoie as Monsieur Prouve
 Lita Tresierra as Cindy

Recognition
The Girl in the White Coat earned Pascale Montpetit a Genie Award nomination for Best Actress at the 32nd Genie Awards in 2012. At the 15th Jutra Awards in 2013, Joey Klein was nominated for Best Supporting Actor.

References

External links
 Official Website of The Girl in the White Coat

2011 films
Canadian drama films
2011 drama films
2010s French-language films
Films based on The Overcoat
Films shot in Montreal
Films directed by Darrell Wasyk
French-language Canadian films
2010s English-language films
2011 multilingual films
Canadian multilingual films
2010s Canadian films